The , also known as the  or the , was the most brutal bear attack in Japanese history. It took place from December 9-14, 1915, when a Ussuri brown bear woke from hibernation and repeatedly attacked several houses in Hokkaidō, Japan, killing seven settlers.

Prelude 
At dawn in mid-November 1915, a Ussuri brown bear appeared at the Ikeda family's house in Sankebetsu Rokusen-sawa, about 11 kilometers inland from the west coast of Hokkaidō. The surprise encounter prompted the family horse into panic, but the bear fled after taking only harvested corn. In those days, Sankebetsu was newly settled; encroachment by wild animals was not uncommon.

On November 20, 1915, the bear reappeared. Worrying about the safety of the horse, the head of the Ikeda family called on his second son, Kametarō, and two Matagi from his own village and a neighbouring village.
 
When the bear reappeared on November 30, they took a shot at it, but failed to kill it. The next morning, they followed the bear's footprints, which led towards . Along the trail the hunting party discovered bloodstains, but a snowstorm forced them to turn back. They believed that the bear, having been injured, would now fear humans and would no longer raid settlements.

December attacks

December 9: Ōta family 

On December 9, 1915, at 10:30 a.m., the giant brown bear turned up at the home of the Ōta family. Abe Mayu, the farmer's wife, and Hasumi Mikio, a baby being taken care of by Mayu, were at the house. Mikio was bitten on the head and killed. Mayu fought back, apparently by throwing firewood, and tried to escape. She was overtaken, knocked down, and dragged into the forest. According to contemporary descriptions, the scene resembled a slaughterhouse, with blood puddled on the farmhouse floor.

December 10

Search 
Early in the morning, Saitō Ishigorō and Miyoke Yasutarō left the village on their respective errands. Meanwhile, a search party comprising thirty men was organized to capture the brown bear and recover the remains of Mayu. This group entered the forest and had advanced no more than 150 meters when it met the bear. Five men shot at the bear, but only one managed to land a hit. The enraged animal nevertheless retreated, and the men escaped injury. After the bear had fled, the hunters scouted the area and discovered dried blood on the snow at the base of a Sakhalin fir tree. Beneath the snow was the corpse of Mayu with only the head and parts of the legs remaining. The bear had stashed the body of Mayu in the snow in an attempt to preserve it, as well as to hide it from scavengers.  It was thus proven that this particular brown bear had attacked the Ōta family.

Return to the Ōta farm 
The villagers believed that once the bear had a taste for human flesh, its return to the settlement was assured. Villagers gathered at the Ōta family's home with guns. Around 8:00 p.m. that night, the bear reappeared. Although the villagers had anticipated the bear's return, they were nonetheless panicked by it. One man did manage to shoot at the bear. By the time the corps of 50 guardsmen posted 300 meters away at the neighboring Miyoke house arrived, the bear had vanished into the woods. The corps reassembled and headed downstream on what was thought to be the bear's trail.

Miyouke family 
When news of the Ōta family attack was first received by the Miyouke family, women and children sought refuge there while guardsmen patrolled outside. The guardsmen were having dinner when news of the bear's return to the Ōta farm reached them, and they marched off. The bear, having escaped death at the Ōta house, now fled to the Miyouke homestead.

Yayo, Miyouke Yasutarō's wife, was preparing a late meal while carrying her fourth son, Umekichi, on her back. She heard a rumbling noise outside, but before she could investigate, the bear broke through a window and entered the house. The cooking pot on the hearth was overturned, dousing the flames, and in the ensuing panic the oil lamp was put out as well, plunging the house into darkness. Yayo tried to flee the house, but her second son, Yūjirō, clung to her legs, tripping her as she ran. The bear attacked her and bit Umekichi.

Odo had remained at the house as the only bodyguard. When he ran for the door, the bear released the mother and child to pursue him. Yayo then escaped with her children. Odo attempted to hide behind furniture but was clawed in the back. The bear then mauled Kinzō, the third son of the Miyouke family, and Haruyoshi, the fourth son of the Saito family, killing them, and bit Iwao, the third son of the Saitō family. Next to be targeted was Take, Saitō Ishigorō's pregnant wife. She too was attacked, killed, and eaten. From later testimony, villagers heard Take begging the bear not to touch her belly but instead to eat her head. Later the fetus was found alive from her corpse unharmed.

The guardsmen who had tracked the bear downriver realized that they were not, in fact, on its trail. As they hurried back to the settlement, a seriously injured Yayo met them and related news of the attack at the Miyouke family's house. The corps raced there to rescue any survivors. When they arrived, the house was dark but sounds of an attack emerged. Believing that the bear had killed everyone inside, some of the guardsmen proposed setting the house on fire. Yayo, hoping that some of the children still lived, forbade this.

The guardsmen were divided into two groups: one, consisting of ten men, stood guard at the door while the other group went to the back of the house. When given a signal, the group at the rear set up a racket, shouting and rattling their weapons. As expected, the bear appeared at the front door. The men there had bunched up, with lines of fire blocked by the guard at their head, whose own rifle misfired. Amid the general confusion and risk of crossfire, the bear escaped into the night. Carrying torches made of birch bark, they entered the house and beheld the results of the attack.

Rikizō and Hisano, first son and daughter of the same relatives, were injured but lived. The village people gathered in the school, and seriously injured people were accommodated in the Tsuji family house near the river. After the incident, only veterans of the Russo-Japanese War remained at their posts.

Yamamoto Heikichi and "Kesagake" 
Meanwhile, Saitō Ishigorō, unaware of his family's fate, filed a report with authorities and the district police before returning to Tomakomai and lodging at a local hotel there.

Miyouke Yasutarō had heard that a man named Yamamoto Heikichi was an expert bear hunter and so paid a visit to his house. Unable to return home, Yasutarō stayed in Onishika (now Obira, Hokkaido).

December 11 
On December 11, Miyoke Yasutarō and Saitō Ishigorō returned to Sankebetsu. Noticing the villagers gathered at the branch school, the two pieced together the story of the mauling. A group of men, including Miyoke and Saitō, was formed to kill the bear. Believing that the bear would reappear, they decided to wait for the bear at Miyoke's residence, but the night passed with no attack.

December 12 
The news of the bear's appearance in Sankebetsu reached the Hokkaidō Government Office, and under the leadership of the Hoboro (now Haboro town) branch police station, a sniper team was organized. Guns and volunteers for the team were gathered from nearby towns, and after getting permission from "Teishitsu Rinya kyoku" (the "Imperial Forestry Agency", now "Rin'ya chō"), the sniper team went to Sankebetsu that evening. Chief Inspector Suga, the branch office commissioner, went up the Rokusen sawa with the aim of viewing the Miyoke family house and assessing the state of the sniper team and met all those who got off the mountain pass.

The brown bear did not appear on December 12.  

It was decided that the bear would most probably try to retrieve the bodies of those it had killed, but there were no remains in the Miyoke family house. Therefore, a new plan was proposed: to attempt to lure out the bear with the corpse of a victim. The plan was widely condemned, especially by the Ōta, Saitō, and Miyoke families, but it was decided that for the future of the village it was the best plan.

Within the day, the strategy was executed. The six-member sniper team (which now included Yamamoto Heikichi) waited inside the house, but the bear stopped, appeared to check the inside of the house, and then returned to the forest. The bear did not appear again that night, and so the plan ended in failure.

December 13 
At dawn, a search team discovered that the Ōta family's house was ransacked. The bear had eaten the people's winter food stockpile and ransacked the houses. The bear had damaged at least eight houses, but so far no one could find it. Suga motivated the men by cheering from the village outside. Given that there were now 60 armed men, it was decided that they should hunt in the surrounding mountains.

Kesagake now seemed to lack prudence and stretched its territory downstream. The police captain, Suga, recognized the increasing risk of the situation. He made an ice bridge as a line of defense, then arranged snipers and guards.

That night, a sniper at the bridge thought he saw something in the shadows of the tree stumps on the opposite shore. Receiving this information, Suga thought it might be a man's shadow. When he spoke to it, however, he received no reply and ordered the snipers to open fire. At that moment the shadow, apparently that of the bear, disappeared into the forest. They were disappointed, having failed to kill the bear, but the captain thought he had heard some response from it.

December 14 
The next morning, a team investigated the opposite shore and found a bear's footprint and blood there. Given that Kesagake had again been wounded, and that imminent snowstorms were threatening to cover any tracks, it was decided that this was the most critical opportunity to hunt down and kill the bear. Yamamoto and Ikeda Kamejirō, a guide, immediately set out after the bear. Yamamoto decided to track the bear with a team of two, as it would be quicker than a larger team.

Yamamoto was familiar with Kesagake's behavior and successfully tracked him down. Yamamoto spotted the bear resting near a Japanese oak. He approached to within 20 meters of the bear and shot at it. His first shot hit the bear's heart and the second shot hit his head, fatally wounding the animal. 

When measured, the bear was 340 kg (749 lbs) and 2.7 m (8.85 ft) tall. A necropsy was carried out on the bear, during which parts of his victims were found in his stomach. While at the time the skull and some of the fur of the bear were kept, they later were lost.

Aftermath 
Yayo, who received head wounds in the attack, made a full recovery, but Miyoke Umekichi, who was bitten by the bear while being carried on his mother's back, died less than three years later from the wounds he had suffered.

Odo recovered from injury and returned to work, but next spring he fell into a river and died. After the attack, most of the villagers of Rokusen-Sawa soon left, and it rapidly transformed into a ghost town.

Ōkawa Haruyoshi, who was seven years old and the son of the Sankebetsu village mayor at the time of the incident, grew up to become a prolific bear hunter. He swore an oath to kill ten bears for every victim of the attack. By the time he reached the age of 62, he had killed 102 bears. He then retired and constructed , a shrine where people can pray for the dead villagers.

Takayoshi, Haruyoshi's son, in 1980—after an eight-year chase—hunted down a 500-kg brown bear who was nicknamed .

Record of the case 
Beginning in 1961, Kimura Moritake, who was working in the district forest office in Asahikawa Kotanbetsu, undertook an examination of the case in order to leave a permanent record of it. Forty-six years had already passed, and little official material was left, so Kimura traced the people who had lived in Sankebetsu in those days and made careful records of their stories. Obtaining a full and accurate picture of events was not possible, as many of the villagers were already deceased and most of the survivors were not cooperative owing to the gruesome nature of the attack.

Akira Yoshimura, a Japanese novelist, gathered information about this case and wrote about it in a novel.

Analysis of the case 
People believed that the attack occurred as a result of the bear waking early from hibernation because of hunger (in Japan, the term  refers to failed hibernation). This would have resulted in increased ferocity.  However, the bear did not actually attack any human beings until being shot by one.

From the end of the Edo era, pioneers had deforested the area, using the firewood to process herring into fertilizer, and they reclaimed the inland area from the beginning of the Meiji era. The deforestation and increased settlement brought humans and bears closer. The lack of natural prey owing to deforestation and human depredation is a common reason for wild animals like brown bears (or leopards and tigers in India) to search for food in close proximity to human habitation.

Memorial 
The shrine, which is overgrown by trees, includes a restored house, a signboard on which the case is explained, and a statue of the brown bear. The place is near , which spans the Sankebetsu River.

Hokkaidō Road 1049 was called a bear road, and there are many signboards showing a bear. These can be found at gates and at the wayside of the road. It is suggested that the posture expresses the symbiosis of wild animals and human beings. Since numerous tourists who visit there know the history of the area, they may possibly interpret it as an ironic or humorous statement.

Dramatization of the incident

Novel
1965:  by Yukio Togawa
1977:  by Akira Yoshimura

Radio play
1980:  by Sou Kuramoto, starring Rentarō Mikuni

Stage performance
1986:  by Sou Kuramoto

Manga
 vol.3～5 by Yukio Togawa (story) and Takao Yaguchi (art)

Movie
1990:  Sonny Chiba (director), Hiroyuki Sanada, Mika Muramatsu, Bunta Sugawara

See also
Sloth bear of Mysore
Bear attack
Bear danger

Reference books 
木村盛武1961「獣害史最大の惨劇苫前羆事件」
木村盛武1994『慟哭の谷 The Devil's Valley』（共同文化社)
吉村昭1982「羆嵐」(新潮社)
木村 盛武1983『エゾヒグマ百科―被害・予防・生態・故事』（共同文化社）

Notes

References

External links
 Hokkaidō Tomakomai-gun Engai Jiken by Saikon Dōjō
 

Bear attacks
Individual bears
Deaths due to bear attacks
History of Hokkaido
1915 in Japan
Man-eaters
December 1915 events
Individual wild animals